Patrick Kavanagh (1904–1967) was an Irish poet.

Patrick Kavanagh is also the name of:
Patrick Kavanagh (police officer) (1923–2013), British police officer
P. J. Kavanagh (1931–2015), English poet, writer and actor
Pat Kavanagh (ice hockey) (born 1979), ice hockey player
Pat Kavanagh (agent) (1940–2008), British literary agent
Patrick Kavanagh (footballer, born 1985), Irish football player for Shelbourne
Patrick Kavanagh (Olympic footballer) (died 1993), Irish Olympic football player
Pat Kavanagh (Kilkenny hurler), retired Irish hurler
Pat Kavanagh (Cork hurler) (born 1952), Irish Gaelic footballer and hurler
Pat Kavanagh, former Irish Green Party councillor and member of the Fís Nua political party
Pat Kavanagh (born 1983), bass player for metal bands Threat Signal and Arkaea

See also
Patrick Cavanagh (died 1581), Irish Catholic martyr
Patrick Cavanaugh, American television actor, active since 1999
Patrick Kavanaugh (1954–2018) composer
Patrick Kavanagh Poetry Award